was a  after Ōei and before Eikyō, from April 1428 until September 1429.

Change of era
 1428 : The era name was changed to mark an event or a number of events. The previous era ended and a new one commenced in Ōei 35.

Events of the Shōchō era
 February 3, 1428 (Shōchō 1, 18th day of the 1st month): Shōgun Ashikaga Yoshimochi, having taken power again after the death of his son, dies himself at the age of 43.
 August, 1428 (Shōchō 1, 7th month): Shocho Uprising begins.
 August 30, 1428 (Shōchō 1, 20th day of the 7th month): Emperor Shōkō died at the age of 27. Nihon Ōdai Ichiran suggests a cause of death by explaining: "Ce prince, s'occupait de magie et du culte de démons, mena une vie pure, et observa rigoureusement l'abstinence et le jeûne." [This prince, who occupied himself with magic and the cult of demons, led a pure life, and rigorously observed abstinence and fasting.]
 September 7, 1428 (Shōchō 1, 29th day of the 7th month): Emperor Go-Hanazono accedes to the throne at age 10.

Notes

References
 Nussbaum, Louis Frédéric and Käthe Roth. (2005). Japan Encyclopedia. Cambridge: Harvard University Press. ; OCLC 48943301
 Titsingh, Isaac. (1834). Nihon Odai Ichiran; ou,  Annales des empereurs du Japon.  Paris: Royal Asiatic Society, Oriental Translation Fund of Great Britain and Ireland. OCLC 5850691

External links
 National Diet Library, "The Japanese Calendar" -- historical overview plus illustrative images from library's collection

Japanese eras